The Ring Road is a , six-lane ring road encircling the city of Indore, Madhya Pradesh, India. It is built by Indore Development Authority (IDA).

Construction

Road
The road is a six-lane bituminous road, along with a bi-lane service road on both sides near major junctures.

Bridges
The whole stretch of Ring Road consists of four functional flyovers at Bengali Square, World Cup Square, Teen Imli Square and the Kesarbagh Rail Overbridge over the Akola-Ratlam line.

History
In July 2022, the authorities announced plans to construct a  Outer Ring Road to decrease the load as well as to extend the current ring road.

See also
List of state highways in Madhya Pradesh

References

State Highways in Madhya Pradesh